The 4th World Cup season began in December 1969 in France and concluded in March 1970 in Norway. Karl Schranz of Austria won his second consecutive overall title.  Michèle Jacot of France won the women's overall title.

For the final time, the results of the World Championships, held in 1970 in Val Gardena, Italy, were included in the World Cup standings (except for the Alpine Combined results, because that discipline was not recognized in the World Cup until the 1974/75 season).  Future Olympic and World Championship results were not included as World Cup races.

Malcolm Milne of Australia won the season's first downhill at Val d'Isère in December to become the first alpine racer from the Southern Hemisphere to win a World Cup event.

Calendar

Men

Note: Races 18, 19, and 20 were the events from the Alpine World Ski Championships in Val Gardena.This was the final time that the World Championships (or Olympics) were counted in the World Cup standings.

Women

Note: Races 18, 19, and 20 were the events from the Alpine World Ski Championships in Val Gardena.This was the final time that the World Championships (or Olympics) were counted in the World Cup standings.

Men

Overall 
see complete table

In Men's Overall World Cup 1969/70 the best three downhills, best three giant slaloms and best three slaloms count. 18 racers had a point deduction.

Downhill 

see complete table

In Men's Downhill World Cup 1969/70 the best 3 results count.

Giant Slalom 

see complete table

In Men's Giant Slalom World Cup 1969/70 the best 3 results count. Gustav Thöni won the cup with maximum points.

Slalom 

see complete table

Patrick Russel and Alain Penz won the cup with maximum points. French athletes won 10 races out of 11!

Women

Overall 

see complete table

In Women's Overall World Cup 1969/70 the best three results from each discipline (downhill, giant slalom, and slalom) counted. Nineteen racers had a point deduction.

Downhill 

see complete table

In Women's Downhill World Cup 1969/70 the best 3 results count. Isabelle Mir won the cup with maximum points.

Giant Slalom 

see complete table

Slalom 

see complete table

Ingrid Lafforgue won the cup with maximum points. She won five races and four of them in a row.

Nations cup

Overall

Men

Women

Medal table

Notes

External links
FIS-ski.com – World Cup standings – 1970

 
FIS Alpine Ski World Cup
World Cup
World Cup